Bahru Zewde (born 1947 in Addis Ababa) is an Ethiopian historian and author. He writes extensively about modern Ethiopian history (1855 to the present) and is now an emeritus professor at Addis Ababa University where he once served as the Head of the History Department and the Director of the Institute of Ethiopian Studies.

Early life and education 
He earned his B.A. in History with distinction from Haile Selassie I University (now known as Addis Ababa University) in 1970 and his Ph.D. in African history from the School of Oriental and African Studies at the University of London in 1976.

Career 
In addition to his professorship at Addis Ababa University, Zewde was a visiting professor at University of Illinois at Urbana-Champaign in 1992 and at Hamburg University in 2002. He has also held fellowships at the British Academy, Oxford University, and the Japan Foundation.

Selected publications 

 A History of Modern Ethiopia 1855–1991. Suffolk: James Currey. 1991. 
 Pioneers of Change In Ethiopia: the Reformist Intellectuals of the Early Twentieth Century. Athens: Ohio University Press. 2002; Oxford: James Currey. 2002.
 'Between the Jaws of Hyenas': A Diplomatic History of Ethiopia 1876-1896. Wiesbaden: Harrassowitz. 2002., editor.
 Land, Gender and the Periphery: Themes in the History of Eastern and Southern Africa. Addis Ababa: Organisation for Social Science Research in Eastern and Southern Africa. 2005., editor.
 Society, State, and Identity in African History. Addis Ababa: Forum for Social Science. 2008., editor.
 Documenting the Ethiopian Student Movement: an Exercise in Oral History. Addis Ababa: Forum for Social Studies. 2010.
 Society & State in Ethiopian History. Los Angeles: TSEHAI Publishers. 2012.
 The Quest for Socialist Utopia: The Ethiopian Student Movement, c. 1960-1974. Suffolk: James Currey. 2014.

References 

1947 births
Living people
Ethiopian historians
Addis Ababa University alumni
Alumni of SOAS University of London
Ethiopian expatriates in the United Kingdom
Ethiopianists
Fellows of the African Academy of Sciences